Colin McLarty (born July 12, 1951) is an American logician whose publications have ranged widely in philosophy and the foundations of mathematics, as well as in the history of science and of mathematics.

Research

Category theory 
He has written papers about Saunders Mac Lane, one of the founders of category theory.

McLarty's Elementary Categories and Elementary Toposes describes category theory and topos theory at an elementary level.

McLarty worked on establishing that Fermat's Last Theorem can be proven in a setting with much weaker assumptions than the ones used in Wiles' proof, which makes use of involved category theoretical constructions.

History of Mathematics 
He is a member of the Grothendieck Circle, which provides on-line and open access to many writings about the mathematician Alexandre Grothendieck, who revolutionized Banach-space theory and algebraic geometry and whose life has fascinated many biographers and mathematical scientists.

McLarty has also written about the German algebraist Emmy Noether and her involvement with German political history.

Positions
At Case Western Reserve University (CWRU), Colin McLarty is the Truman P. Handy Professor of Philosophy and the current Chair of the Philosophy Department.

At CWRU, he is also a professor of mathematics.

Bibliography
 
 Colin McLarty, The Uses and Abuses of the History of Topos Theory, Br. J. Philos. Sci, 41 (1990) p 355. 
 Colin McLarty, 'Emmy Noether’s ‘Set Theoretic’ Topology: From Dedekind to the rise of functors' in The Architecture of Modern Mathematics: Essays in history and philosophy (edited by Jeremy Gray and José Ferreirós), Oxford University Press (2006) p. 187–208.
 McLarty, Colin, 2005, "Saunders Mac Lane (1909–2005): His Mathematical Life and Philosophical Works," Philosophia Mathematica 13: 237–51. With selected bibliography emphasizing Mac Lane's philosophical writings.
 --------, 2007, "The Last Mathematician from Hilbert's Göttingen: Saunders Mac Lane as Philosopher of Mathematics,", British Journal for the Philosophy of Science 58(1): 77–112.

See also
 "Abstract nonsense", a (usually ironic) term for category theory and category-theoretic arguments in homological algebra
 "Generalized abstract nonsense", an ironic and affectionate term for topos theory
 Other topos theorists (besides Saunders Mac Lane):
 Martin Hyland
 Peter Johnstone 
 William Lawvere

References

External links
 Personal website of Colin McLarty
 CWRU website of Colin McLarty
 Grothendieck Circle, which lists McLarty as a member. (A collection of mathematical and biographical information, photos, links about Alexander Grothendieck.)
 

Category theorists
Mathematical logicians
American logicians
Philosophers of mathematics
American historians of mathematics
Philosophers of science
Historians of science
Intellectual historians
Algebraists 
Algebraic geometers 
20th-century American mathematicians
21st-century American mathematicians
20th-century American philosophers
Living people
21st-century American philosophers
1951 births